Live Sessions may refer to:

 Live Sessions EP (Dami Im EP)
 Live Sessions (Matt Hires EP)
 Live Sessions (Bonobo EP)